Shi Lian Huang, better known as S. L. Huang, is a Hugo-winning science fiction author, as well as the first woman to be a professional armorer in Hollywood.

Biography

Shi Lian Huang, known as Lisa, is from New Jersey and she completed a degree in mathematics at MIT before moving to Los Angeles. A two-time survivor of cancer, she experienced Hodgkin’s lymphoma as a child and, after moving to Hollywood to become a stuntwoman and weapons expert, suffered a secondary occurrence in the form of breast cancer, which "derailed her physicality" for a time. She turned to writing when unable to actively work on sets.

She is known for her Cas Russell series, as well as her fantasy novella Burning Roses released in 2020. She began as a self-published author but was picked up by Tor Books. The characters in the Cas Russell books, and the superintelligent abilities that they actuate, reflect Huang's background in the mathematical sciences.

Huang also writes short fiction, which won her the Hugo Award for Best Short Story in 2020 with “As the Last I May Know”. She has been published in a number of anthologies and magazines including Strange Horizons and The Best American Science Fiction & Fantasy 2016.

Her work in television includes Battlestar Galactica and Raising Hope, as well as reality shows Top Shot and Auction Hunters. She has trained actors such as Nathan Fillion, Sean Patrick Flanery, Jason Momoa, and Danny Glover.

Personal life
Huang identifies as genderqueer.

Awards

Major awards

Other

Bibliography
A summary bibliography was adapted from the isfdb.

Russell's Attic

Cas Russell Series 
 
 
 
 Stories:
 "A Neurological Study on the Effects of Canine Appeal on Psychopathy, or Rio Adopts a Puppy" (2015)
 "An Examination of Collegial Dynamics as Expressed Through Marksmanship, or Ladies' Day Out" (2015)

Novellas

Anthologies 
Up and Coming: Stories by the 2016 Campbell-Eligible Authors (2016) with Kurt Hunt

Short fiction 
Hunting Monsters (2014)
By Degrees and Dilatory Time (2015)
My Grandmother's Bones (2016)
The Documentarian (2016)
The Little Homo Sapiens Scientist (2016)
The Last Robot (2017)
Split Shadow (2017)
Time Travel Is Only for the Poor (2017)
The Woman Who Destroyed Us (2018)
Dulce et Decorum (2018)
Devouring Tongues (2018)
As the Last I May Know (2019)
The Million-Mile Sniper (2020)

References 

Living people
American science fiction writers
People with non-binary gender identities
Year of birth missing (living people)
Non-binary writers
Hugo Award-winning writers